Lina Pizzolongo (January 25, 1925, Montreal - September 21, 1991, Toronto) was a Canadian vocal coach and concert pianist. She was married to baritone Louis Quilico and was the mother of two children Donna and Gino Quilico, also a baritone.

Career 

She studied first at the Conservatoire de musique du Québec à Montréal, with Yvonne Hubert, then at the "École normale de musique" in Paris, with Alfred Cortot and Marguerite Long, and at the Accademia Nazionale di Santa Cecilia in Rome with Carlo Zecchi. She performed as a soloist with the Montreal Symphony Orchestra and the CBC Radio Orchestra. She taught as an instructor first at the Montréal Conservatory, and later at the University of Toronto from 1970 to 1987, and the McGill University from 1987 to 1990. As a vocal coach and accompanist, she was the primary influence in the careers of her husband Louis and son Gino.

External links 
Lina Quilico (Canadian Encyclopedia of Music)

1925 births
1991 deaths
Accademia Nazionale di Santa Cecilia alumni
Canadian women pianists
Conservatoire de musique du Québec à Montréal alumni
Musicians from Montreal
Academic staff of the Conservatoire de musique du Québec à Montréal
Academic staff of the University of Toronto
Academic staff of McGill University
20th-century Canadian pianists
20th-century Canadian women musicians
20th-century women pianists